Flakstadvåg is a village in Senja Municipality in Troms og Finnmark county, Norway.  It is located along the Selfjorden on the southwestern part of the island of Senja.  It is surrounded by the fjord, mountains, and a marsh. There is one road connection to the village from the outside world.  Ånderdalen National Park lies just to the northeast of the village.  Flakstadvåg Chapel is located here.

References

Villages in Troms
Senja